3 Generations is a non-profit documentary film production company based in New York City.

The company's stated aim is "to support survivors of genocide and victims of crimes against humanity by helping them share their stories."

3 Generations has produced documentary films includingThe Devil Came on Horseback, Tricked, A Different American Dream, Lost in Lebanon, Pot Luck, and Preserving the Holocaust.

Background
3 Generations was founded by director Jane I. Wells in 2007 after a visit to Western Sudan, where she witnessed the impact of the Darfur genocide on survivors.

Whilst in Darfur, Wells encountered photojournalist Brian Steidle, with whom she agreed to produce The Devil Came On Horseback, a film about his experiences documenting the genocide.

Wells' father, Sidney Bernstein, was a filmmaker and producer, who accompanied the Allied Forces during the liberation of Bergen-Belsen, documenting the conditions inside the concentration camp. Suppressed at the time by Britain's post-war government due to foreign policy concerns, Bernstein's film was restored in 2008 by the Imperial War Museum, with production from 3 Generations, and released in 2017 under the title German Concentration Camps Factual Survey.

Wells stated in 2007 that the impetus for using the medium of documentary film to highlight human rights injustices is to "foster the healing process and illuminate our common humanity."

Filmography

Festivals
A Kaddish for Selim (2022)
Official Selection, New York Jewish Film Festival 2022

''Any Given Day (2021)Official Selection, Hot Docs Film Festival 2021Preserving the Holocaust (2021) 
Official Selection, UNAFF (United Nations Association Film Festival) 2021
Official Selection, Atlanta Jewish Film Festival 2021
Winner Award of Merit, Best Shorts Competition 2021
Official Selection, Miami Jewish Film Festival 2021
Finalist, Gershman Philadelphia Jewish Film Festival 2021
Official Selection, American Documentary And Animation Film Festival 2021
Official Selection, UK Jewish Film Festival 2021Pot Luck: The Altered State of Colorado (2020)Official Selection, SR Socially Relevant Film Film Festival 2020
Winner, Best Documentary Creation International Film Festival 2020
Winner, Best Editing Creation International Film Festival 2020
Official Selection, Manhattan Film Festival 2020
Official Selection, New Hope Film Festival 2020
Official Selection, Rincon International Film Festival 2020Go Debbie (2018)Official Selection, United Nations Association Film Festival 2018
Official Selection, Cinema Diverse: The Palm Springs LGBTQ Film Festival 2018
Official Selection, New Filmmakers Los Angeles 2018
Best LGBT Short, New York City Short Film Festival 2018
Official Selection, Denver Film Festival 2018Lost in Lebanon (2017)Official Selection, New York Human Rights Watch Film Festival 2017
Official Selection, One World Film Festival 2017
Official Selection, London Human Rights Watch Film Festival 2017A Different American Dream (2016)Official Selection, American Indian Film Festival 2016 
Official Selection, Margaret Mead Film Festival 2016
Winner, Best Documentary, Red Nation Film Festival 2016
Official Selection, Reykjavik International Film Festival 2016
Official Selection, Thessaloniki Documentary Festival 2016Tricked (2013)Official Selection, Montclair Film Festival 2014
Winner, Silver Lei Award, Honolulu FIlm Awards 2013The Devil Came On Horseback'' (2007)
Winner, Seeds of War Award, Full Frame Documentary Film Festival 2007
Winner, Full Frame/Working Films Award, Full Frame Documentary Film Festival 2007 
Winner, Docudrama Award, Amnesty International Media Awards 2008
Winner, Witness Award, Silverdocs 2007
Winner, Women In Cinema Lena Sharpe Award, Seattle International Film Festival 2007
Winner, Adrienne Shelley Excellence in Filmmaking Award, Nantucket Film Festival 2007
Official Selection, Sundance Film Festival 2007
Official Selection, Cinevegas 2007
Official Selection, Tribeca Film Festival 2007
Official Selection, Human Rights Watch Film Festival 2007
Nominated, Best Documentary, News and Documentary, Emmy Awards 2009
Nominated, Gotham Independent Film Award, Gotham Awards 2007

References

Film production companies of the United States